Ted Thorpe may refer to:

Ted Thorpe (footballer, born 1898), Edwin Thorpe
Ted Thorpe (footballer, born 1910), Albert Edward Thorpe

See also
Edward Thorpe (disambiguation)